Enaretta is a genus of beetles in the family Cerambycidae, containing the following species:

 Enaretta acaciarum Aurivillius, 1924
 Enaretta aethiopica Breuning, 1938
 Enaretta brevicauda Breuning, 1939
 Enaretta brevicornis Lacordaire, 1872
 Enaretta castelnaudii Thomson, 1864
 Enaretta caudata (Fahraeus, 1872)
 Enaretta conifera Aurivillius, 1921
 Enaretta montana Breuning, 1938
 Enaretta paulinoi (Quedenfeldt, 1855)
 Enaretta somaliensis Breuning, 1939
 Enaretta varia (Pascoe, 1886)

References

 
Cerambycidae genera